Josip Reić (born 24 July 1965) is a Yugoslav rower. He was part of the team which won a bronze in Coxed pairs in the 1980 Summer Olympics in Moscow.

References

External links
  

1965 births
Living people
Olympic rowers of Yugoslavia
Rowers at the 1980 Summer Olympics
Olympic bronze medalists for Yugoslavia
Olympic medalists in rowing
Yugoslav male rowers
Medalists at the 1980 Summer Olympics